Call Your Mother is an American television multi-camera sitcom created by Kari Lizer that premiered on ABC on January 13, 2021, as a midseason entry in the 2020–21 television season. In May 2021, the series was canceled after one season.

Premise
The series follows an empty nest mother, who decides to be close to her children by moving cross country from Waterloo, Iowa to Los Angeles, California in order to be with them, much to their chagrin.

Cast

Main
 Kyra Sedgwick as Jean Raines, a retired teacher and empty nest mother who reinserts herself into her children's lives
 Joey Bragg as Freddie Raines, Jean's 23-year-old son and a video game designer and tester
 Rachel Sennott as Jackie Raines, Jean's 25-year-old daughter and her eldest child
 Austin Crute as Lane, Jackie's gay best friend and roommate
 Emma Caymares as Celia, Freddie's fiancée who's a social media influencer
 Patrick Brammall as Danny, a therapist and Jean's Airbnb host

Recurring

 Sherri Shepherd as Sharon, Jean's best friend who works as a security guard at Ross Dress for Less
 Jackie Seiden as Cheryl, Danny's estranged wife

Episodes

Production

Development
The series was first ordered as a pilot by ABC in September 2019 and was one of many projects that Lizer had under her deal with Sony. On January 23, 2020, the series was given the working title My Village. On March 6, 2020, it was announced that Pamela Fryman would direct the pilot. The series was green-lighted by ABC on May 21, 2020 and was re-titled as Call Your Mother. On June 17, 2020, it was announced that the series would premiere in the fall of 2020 and air on Wednesdays at 9:30 P.M. However, the next day it was announced that it will switch places with Black-ish, and will instead premiere midseason. The series premiered on January 13, 2021. On May 14, 2021, ABC canceled the series after one season.

Casting 
On March 2, 2020, it was announced that Kyra Sedgwick had joined the pilot and would portray as Jean Raines. The same month, Rachel Sennott was cast in the role of Jackie Raines, while Joey Bragg,  Emma Caymares and Austin Crute were cast as Freddie Raines, Celia and Lane, respectively. Upon series order announcement, Patrick Brammall joined the main cast as Danny. On September 28, 2020, Sherri Shepherd was cast in a recurring role. On December 14, 2020, Jackie Seiden joined the cast in a recurring capacity.

Filming
The pilot was originally expected to begin filming in April 2020, however on March 13, 2020, production was delayed as a direct result of the COVID-19 pandemic in the United States before filming could begin.

Reception

Critical response
On Rotten Tomatoes, the series holds an approval rating of 9% based on 11 reviews, with an average rating of 4/10. 
On Metacritic, the series has a weighted average score of 44 out of 100 based on 8 critics, indicating "mixed or average reviews".

Ratings

References

External links 
 

2020s American LGBT-related comedy television series
2020s American sitcoms
2021 American television series debuts
2021 American television series endings
American Broadcasting Company original programming
American LGBT-related sitcoms
English-language television shows
Television productions postponed due to the COVID-19 pandemic
Television series about families
Television series by ABC Studios
Television series by Sony Pictures Television
Television shows set in Los Angeles